Energija - Sporto Centras Elektrenai is an ice hockey team in Elektrenai, Lithuania. They play in the Lithuania Hockey League, the top level of ice hockey in Lithuania. The club was founded in 2008, and plays their home games at the Elektrenai Ice Palace.

Achievements
Lithuanian champion (2): 2010, 2011.

External links
Team profile on eurohockey.com
Official website

Ice hockey teams in Lithuania